Middlemost Post is an American animated comedy television series created by John Trabbic III that premiered on Nickelodeon on July 9, 2021.

Premise 
Parker J. Cloud, a former raincloud, their friend Angus, and pet walrus Russell deliver mail all across Mount Middlemost.

Characters 
 Parker J. Cloud (voiced by Becky Robinson)
 Angus Roy Shackelton (voiced by John DiMaggio)
 Lily (voiced by Kiren)
 Mayor Peeve (voiced by Colton Dunn)
 Ryan (voiced by Johnny Pemberton)

Guest
 Old Skool (voiced by Del the Funky Homosapien)
 Hawk Man (voiced by Tony Hawk)

Production 
On June 16, 2020, it was announced that Nickelodeon had ordered the series from SpongeBob SquarePants storyboard director, John Trabbic III. The 20-episode series is produced by Nickelodeon Animation Studio, with work being done remotely during the COVID-19 pandemic. The animation is done by Yowza! Animation in Canada. On March 18, 2021, it was revealed via Nickelodeon's 2021 upfront show that the series would premiere in July 2021. On June 17, 2021, it was announced that the series would premiere on July 9, 2021, and the first trailer for the series was released.

On March 24, 2022, the series was renewed for a second season of 13 episodes, which premiered on August 2, 2022.

Episodes

Series overview

Season 1 (2021–22)

Howie Perry serves as the supervising director of each episode.

Season 2 (2022)

Shorts

Notes

References

External links 
 
 

2021 American television series debuts
2020s American animated television series
2020s American children's comedy television series
2020s Nickelodeon original programming
English-language television shows
2020s American animated comedy television series
American children's animated comedy television series
Nicktoons